The 1992 Paris-Cape Town Rally was the 14th running of the Dakar Rally event with a unique routing. The route passed through Libya, Niger, Chad, Central African Republic, Cameroon, Gabon, Republic of the Congo, Angola, and Namibia.
Participants used maritime transport to get from Pointe-Noire (Republic of the Congo) to Lobito (Angola), so they did not cross the territory of Zaire.
Hubert Auriol won the car category to go with his two victories in the motorcycle category. Stephane Peterhansel won the motorcycle category for the second year in succession. The fastest truck in common car-truck classification was Francesco Perlini's Perlini on 16th place.

Stages

References

Dakar Rally
Paris
1992 in French motorsport
1992 in African sport